Visa requirements for Portuguese citizens are administrative entry restrictions by the authorities of other states placed on citizens of Portugal.

As of 25 January 2023, Portuguese citizens had visa-free or visa on arrival access to 188 countries and territories, ranking the Portuguese passport 6th in terms of travel freedom (tied with the passports of France, Ireland and the United Kingdom) according to the Henley Passport Index.


Visa requirements map

Visa requirements

Territories and disputed areas
Visa requirements for Portuguese citizens for visits to various territories, disputed areas, partially recognized countries and restricted zones:

Citizen Card or Passport
 Portuguese Citizen Card (Cartão de cidadão) is valid for these countries :
Due to Freedom of Movement in European Union / Schengen Area:

For Tourism with Citizen Card or Passport is also valid for traveling in these countries:

Citizen Card or Passport is valid for 180 days of visit in (United Kingdom) until 1 October 2021

Citizen Card or Passport is valid for 90 days of visit in (Albania), (Andorra), (Bosnia and Herzegovina), (Kosovo), (Monaco), (Moldova), (North Macedonia), (Northern Cyprus), (Serbia), (San Marino), (Turkey) and (Vatican City).

(Georgia) Citizen Card or Passport is valid for 1 year of visit.

(Montenegro) Citizen Card is valid for 30 days of visit, or with Passport for 90 days of visit.

1 – (Egypt) Citizen Card or Passport is valid for 30 days of visit, {evisa} or {visa on arrival}.

2 – (Tunisia) Citizen Card is valid on an Organized Tours visit only, or with Passport – {Visa not Required} is valid for 90 days of visit.

(Jordan) Citizen Card is valid on an Organized Tours visit or with Passport – {visa on arrival} is valid for 30 days of visit.

Remote work visas
Portuguese citizens can apply for a resident permit on the basis of a remote worker from the following countries:

Working holiday agreement
Portuguese citizens aged 18–30 (or 18–35 in some cases) can apply for a resident permit on the basis of a working holiday from the following countries:

Non-ordinary passports
Holders of various categories of official Portuguese passports have additional visa-free access to the following countries – Algeria (diplomatic, service or special passports), Angola (diplomatic, service or special passports), Azerbaijan (diplomatic, service or special passports), China (diplomatic passports),  Republic of the Congo (diplomatic passports), Indonesia (diplomatic, official or service passports), Kazakhstan (diplomatic passports), Kuwait (diplomatic, service or special passports), Mozambique (diplomatic, official or service passports), Qatar (diplomatic or special passports), Russia (diplomatic passports) and São Tomé and Príncipe (diplomatic or service passports), Turkey (diplomatic or service passports) . Holders of diplomatic or service passports of any country have visa-free access to Cape Verde, Ethiopia, Mali and Zimbabwe.

Non-visa restrictions

Fingerprinting
Several countries including Argentina, Cambodia, Colombia,  Japan, Malaysia, Saudi Arabia, South Korea and the United States demand all passengers to be fingerprinted on arrival.

Right to consular protection in non-EU countries

When in a non-EU country where there is no Portuguese embassy, Portuguese citizens as EU citizens have the right to get consular protection from the embassy of any other EU country present in that country.

See also List of diplomatic missions of Portugal.

Passport validity
Many countries require passports to be valid for at least 6 months upon arrival and one or two blank pages. Countries requiring passports to be validity at least 6 months on arrival include Afghanistan, Algeria, Bhutan, Botswana, Brunei, Cambodia,  Comoros, Côte d'Ivoire, Ecuador, Egypt, El Salvador, Fiji, Guyana, Indonesia, Iran, Iraq (except when arriving at Basra – 3 months and Erbil or Sulaimaniyah – on arrival), Israel, Kenya, Laos, Madagascar, Malaysia, Marshall Islands, Myanmar, Namibia, Nicaragua, Nigeria, Oman, Palau, Papua New Guinea, Philippines, Rwanda, Saint Lucia, Samoa, Saudi Arabia, Singapore, Solomon Islands, Sri Lanka, Suriname, Taiwan, Tanzania, Timor-Leste, Tonga, Tuvalu, Uganda, Vanuatu, Venezuela, Vietnam, countries requiring passport validity of at least 4 months on arrival include Micronesia, Zambia, countries requiring passport validity of at least 3 months on arrival include Georgia, Honduras, Iceland, Jordan, Kuwait, Lebanon, Moldova, Nauru, Panama, United Arab Emirates and countries requiring passport validity of at least 1 month on arrival include Eritrea, Hong Kong, Macao, New Zealand, South Africa. Other countries require either a passport valid on arrival or passport valid throughout the period of intended stay.

See also

 Visa requirements for European Union citizens
 Visa policy of the Schengen Area
 Foreign relations of Portugal

References and Notes
References

Notes

Portugal
Foreign relations of Portugal